Villaria is a genus of plants in the family Rubiaceae. It contains 5 accepted species, all endemic to the Philippines.

Villaria acutifolia (Elmer) Merr. - Mindanao
Villaria fasciculiflora Quisumb. & Merr. - Luzon
Villaria glomerata (Bartl. ex DC.) Mulyan. & Ridsdale - Luzon
Villaria leytensis Alejandro & Meve - Leyte
Villaria odorata (Blanco) Merr. - Luzon

References

Rubiaceae genera
Flora of the Philippines
Octotropideae